AJ Wallace (born 31 March 2003) is a Jamaica international rugby league footballer who plays as a  forward for the Bradford Bulls in the Betfred Championship.

Background
Wallace was born in Huddersfield, West Yorkshire, England. He is of Jamaican descent.

He played his junior rugby league for the St Joseph Sharks, before moving on to Siddal.

Playing career

Club career
Wallace came through the youth system at the Leeds Rhinos before leaving at the end of the 2021 season.

He joined the Bradford Bulls ahead of the 2022 RFL Championship season.

International career
Wallace is an England youth international, having played against France in 2019.

In 2022 he was named in the Jamaica squad for the 2021 Rugby League World Cup. He made his debut in the second-row in the Group C match against Ireland at Headingley Rugby Stadium in Leeds, West Yorkshire.

References

External links
Bradford Bulls profile
Jamaica profile

2003 births
Living people
Bradford Bulls players
English rugby league players
English people of Jamaican descent
Jamaica national rugby league team players
Rugby league players from Huddersfield
Rugby league second-rows